Highway 797 is a provincial highway in the Canadian province of Saskatchewan. It runs from Frenchman Butte, taking over from the Frenchman Butte Access Road, to Alberta Highway 17 / Saskatchewan Highway 17 on the Alberta border. Highway 797 is about 30 km (19 mi.) long.

Highway 797 passes near Fort Pitt, and the community of Harlan is also accessible from the highway.

See also 
Roads in Saskatchewan
Transportation in Saskatchewan

References 

797